Percy Frederick Barrett (1 January 1881 – 20 January 1927) was a Canadian professional golfer of English birth who played in the early 20th century. His best finish in a major tournament, a tie for third place, came in the 1905 U.S. Open at Myopia Hunt Club in South Hamilton, Massachusetts. Barrett won the 1907 Canadian Open as well as the 1923 and 1925 Canadian PGA Championship.

Early life
Barrett was born in Matlock, Derbyshire, England, on 1 January 1881 to William Barrett (1860–1938) and his then girlfriend (but later wife) Emma Barrett née Kiddy (1857–1927). At the time of his birth, Percy's mother was unmarried and living with her parents, therefore his birth name was Percy Frederick Kiddy.

In 1903 Barrett emigrated from England to Toronto, Ontario, Canada, and that same year was appointed as the head golf professional at Lambton Golf and Country Club in Toronto. Barrett, who was 23 years old at the time, had tutelage in England under the legendary Harry Vardon. Under Vardon's watchful eye he apprenticed as a club maker. On 18 September 1907 he married May Owen (1883–1954) in Toronto and the couple had three children.

Professional career
In 1907 Barrett won the Canadian Open which was held at Lambton Golf and Country Club where he remained in the head professional post until 1914. Barrett twice won the Canadian PGA Championship, in 1923 and again in 1925. Barrett was known for using a very short putter that was no more than 20-22 inches long.

Death
Upon his death on 20 January 1927, Barrett's finances were in disarray and he left his family "without provision for their future" according to an article published in the Montreal Gazette on 25 January 1927. He was survived by his wife and three children. An appeal for funds was sent out to collect donations for his estate.

Tournament wins (3)

 Note: This list may be incomplete.
1907 Canadian Open
1923 Canadian PGA Championship
1925 Canadian PGA Championship

Results in major championships

Note: Barrett played only in the U.S. Open.

"T" indicates a tie for a place
? = unknown
Yellow background for top-10

References

English male golfers
Canadian male golfers
Golfers from Toronto
Canadian expatriate sportspeople in England
English emigrants to Canada
1881 births
1927 deaths